Brooklyn Rules is a 2007 American crime drama film directed by Michael Corrente, written by Terence Winter and starring Alec Baldwin, Scott Caan, Freddie Prinze Jr., Jerry Ferrara and Mena Suvari. The plot follows a group of lifelong friends who get involved with the Brooklyn mafia in the 1980s.

Plot

In 1985 Michael (Freddie Prinze Jr.), the narrator, is a lovable charmer with the soul of a con man who successfully scams his way into the pre-law program at Columbia University. In contrast to Michael's desire to leave the Brooklyn streets behind, his close friend Carmine (Scott Caan) is a handsome lady-killer who is enamored of the Mafia lifestyle and wants only to stay there. Rounding out the trio is Bobby (Jerry Ferrara), an endearing cheapskate who longs for a simple life of working at the Post Office and settling down with his fiancée. While at Columbia, Michael falls for a beautiful young student named Ellen (Mena Suvari), a society girl whom he initially wins over with his preppy schoolboy cover. As their relationship blossoms, leaving the streets behind seems increasingly possible, but when Carmine catches the eye of Caesar (Alec Baldwin), a feared Gambino family capo who controls their neighborhood, Michael and Bobby are drawn into that world despite their reluctance to get involved.

Cast
Alec Baldwin as Caesar
Freddie Prinze Jr. as Michael
Paulo Araujo as young Michael
Scott Caan as Carmine
Ty Thomas Reed as young Carmine
Jerry Ferrara as Bobby
Daniel Tay as young Bobby
Mena Suvari as Ellen
Monica Keena as Amy
Annie Golden as Dottie
Ty Reed as Young Carmine
Benny Salerno as the Doorman

Reception 
Brooklyn Rules received mixed reviews from critics. On Rotten Tomatoes the film has an approval rating of 45%, based on 40 reviews, with an average rating of 5.3/10. The site's critical consensus reads, "Brooklyn Rules premise is old hat now, but strong performances from Alec Baldwin and the supporting cast are reasons enough to watch." On Metacritic the film has a score of 53 out of 100, based on 13 critics, indicating "mixed or average reviews".

References

External links
 

2007 films
2007 crime drama films
American crime drama films
2000s English-language films
Films about the American Mafia
Films set in Brooklyn
Films set in 1974
Films set in 1985
The Weinstein Company films
Films directed by Michael Corrente
2000s American films